Matthew Richard Bates (born 26 July 1989, in Exeter, Devon) is a retired British motorcycle speedway rider. He is the grandson of former Exeter Falcons rider and team manager (Bernard “Bronco” Slade). Mattie began his speedway career with the Weymouth Wildcats in 2004 and also had brief spells with the Devon Demons, Mildenhall Fen Tigers, Newport Hornets and Oxford Cheetahs, but is mostly known for his time with the Plymouth Devils and Eastbourne Eagles in the British National League. Since retiring from active racing in 2017 Mattie has since become co promoter and team manager for the Plymouth Gladiators in the British National League as well as becoming one of the main driving forces of the Exeter Falcons goal of finding a new track. Mattie announced in 2020 that he is involved with group with hopes of sending British touring team to America for a series of test matches.

References

Living people
1989 births
Sportspeople from Exeter
British speedway riders
Weymouth Wildcats riders
Mildenhall Fen Tigers riders
Exeter Falcons riders
Oxford Cheetahs riders
Newport Wasps riders
Eastbourne Eagles riders